The Navel of the World or Earth usually refers to the axis mundi or world axis, the supposed center of the world or universe.

Navel of the World or Navel of the Earth may also refer to:

Locations
 The omphalion ("navel") in Delphi, Greece
 The Foundation Stone in Jerusalem, Israel
 Calvary in Jerusalem, Israel
 Israel itself (Tabbur HaAres, Ezek. 38:12)
 The Bodhi Tree in the Mahabodhi Temple in Bodh Gaya, India
 The Hagia Sophia in Istanbul, Turkey
 Babylon in present-day Iraq
 The altar at Paphos, present-day Kouklia, Greece
 Cusco, Peru, according to Incan tradition
 Baboquivari Peak Wilderness in Arizona, USA, according to the O’odham nation
 Belgrade Fortress Roman Well, Serbia
 A lithic site near Ahu Te Pito Kura, Easter Island
 Mir Mine, Sakha Republic, Siberia
 Kingston upon Hull in East Riding of Yorkshire, England

Popular culture
 El Ombligo del Mundo, an earlier name of the Argentinian radio program La Venganza Será Terrible
 Umbilicum mundi, a major plot device in Umberto Eco's novel Foucault's Pendulum
 "Navel of the World", part of the music of Chrono Trigger
 The Fountain of Cho in Mercadia in Magic: The Gathering

See also
 Omphalion
 Umbilicus (disambiguation)